Carposina simulator is a moth in the Carposinidae family. It was described by Davis in 1969. It is found in North America, where it has been recorded from Arkansas.

References

Natural History Museum Lepidoptera generic names catalog

Carposinidae
Moths described in 1969
Moths of North America